Ann Trindade is a Principal Fellow in the History Department at the University of Melbourne, Victoria, Australia.  She was educated at Lady Margaret Hall, Oxford and is the author of a biography of Berengaria of Navarre.

Bibliography
 Berengaria: In Search of Richard the Lionheart's Queen. (1999) Four Courts Press. .

References

External links
 

Australian historians
Alumni of Lady Margaret Hall, Oxford
Year of birth missing (living people)
Living people
Australian women historians